Mattoru Karnan is a 1978 Indian Malayalam film,  directed by J. Sasikumar. The film stars Jayan, Jayabharathi, Jagathy Sreekumar and Adoor Bhasi in the lead roles. The film has musical score by K. J. Joy.

Cast
Jayan
Ravikumar
M. G. Soman
Jayabharathi
Jagathy Sreekumar
Kunchan
Maniyanpilla Raju
Adoor Bhasi
Praveena

Soundtrack
The music was composed by K. J. Joy and the lyrics were written by Chavara Gopi.

References

External links
 

1978 films
1970s Malayalam-language films
Films directed by J. Sasikumar